This is a list of hospitals in Kenya by former provinces and county.  There are 57 public hospitals, including seven national referral hospitals, 47 county referral hospitals, and two sub-county hospitals.  There are 103 private hospitals, 58 mission hospitals, and 12 NGO hospitals in Kenya.  Hospitals are classified into three levels:  Level 6 hospitals are national referral hospitals and large private teaching/mission (faith-based) hospitals; Level 5 hospitals are county referral hospitals and large private/mission (faith-based) hospitals; and Level 4 hospitals are sub-county hospitals and medium-sized private/mission (faith-based) hospitals  The oldest hospital in Kenya is the Mombasa Hospital, which was opened for Europeans in 1891.  In 1898, the British opened the Native Civil Hospital in Makadara for non-European Patients.  In 1944, the government decided to dedicate the Mombasa hospital to the African community and let European and Asian patients go elsewhere.

Medical service levels
The levels of medical services in Kenya are assessed by the Ministry of Medical Services and the Ministry of Public Health and Sanitation.  The same evaluation system is used for all public, private, mission, and NGO type health facilities.

Nairobi County

The largest number of hospitals are in Nairobi County with 62 hospitals.  Notable hospitals are listed below.

Central Province

Since 2013, the former Central Province consists of the following counties: Nyandarua County, Nyeri County, Kirinyaga County, Murang'a County, and Kiambu County.

Coast Province

Eastern Province

North Eastern Province

Nyanza Province

Rift Valley Province

Western Province

See also
Healthcare in Kenya
Counties of Kenya
Mater hospital branches in Kenya
Mater hospital Kenya branches
AAR outpatient branches

Notes

References

 
 

 List
Hospitals
Kenya
Kenya